West Point High School can refer to:

West Point High School (Alabama) in Cullman, Alabama
West Point High School (Arizona) in Tolleson, Arizona
West Point High School (Mississippi) in West Point, Mississippi
West Point High School (Nebraska) in West Point, Nebraska
West Point High School (Virginia) in West Point, Virginia